The Banca Italiana di Sconto (BIS) was a leading Italian bank that went bust in 1921. One firm hit by its collapse was the giant film production conglomerate Unione Cinematografica Italiana (UCI), which itself folded a few years later.
BAO failed in 1923.

References

Bibliography
 
 Toninelli, Pierangelo Maria. The Rise and Fall of State-Owned Enterprise in the Western World. Cambridge University Press, 2000.

Defunct banks of Italy
Banks with year of establishment missing
Banks disestablished in 1921
1921 disestablishments in Italy